KPIT may refer to:

 KPIT Technologies
 Pittsburgh International Airport (ICAO code KPIT)
 KPIT (FM), a radio station (91.7 FM) licensed to Pittsburg, Texas, United States